Sultan: A Memoir is an autobiographical book by Wasim Akram, contributed by Gideon Haigh and published by Harper Collins in 2022.

Akram writes about his struggles with cocaine addiction and mentions Imran Khan.

The book has been reviewed by Ollie Randall of The Times Literary Supplement, Rohit Mahajan of The Tribune India, Chintan Girish Modi of Hindustan Times, R. Kaushik of Moneycontrol and K C Vijaya Kumar of The Hindu.

References 

Pakistani autobiographies
Cricket books